S.O.S. Titanic is a British-American 1979 drama disaster television movie that depicts the doomed 1912 maiden voyage from the perspective of three distinct groups of passengers in First, Second, and Third Class. The script was written by James Costigan and directed by William Hale (credited as Billy Hale). It is the first Titanic film to be filmed and released in colour.

Plot
First Class passengers include a May–December couple, multi-millionaire John Jacob Astor IV (David Janssen) and his new wife Madeleine Talmage Force (Beverly Ross); their friend, Molly Brown (Cloris Leachman); another pair of honeymooners, Daniel and Mary Marvin (Jerry Houser and Deborah Fallender); and Benjamin Guggenheim (John Moffatt), returning to his wife and children after a scandalous affair.

One plot line relates the tentative shipboard romance of two schoolteachers, Lawrence Beesley (David Warner, later appearing in the James Cameron  1997 film Titanic) and the fictional Leigh Goodwin (Susan Saint James).

In steerage, the plot focuses on the experiences of eight Irish immigrants, who are first depicted approaching the ship from a tender in the harbor of Queenstown (now Cobh), Ireland. These characters, all based on real people, include Katie Gilnagh (played by Shevaun Bryers), Kate Mullens, Mary Agatha Glynn, Bridget Bradley, Daniel Buckley, Jim Farrell, Martin Gallagher, and David Chartens. During the voyage, Martin Gallagher falls for an unnamed "Irish beauty."

The cast also includes Helen Mirren in a small role (as Mary Sloan, a real-life surviving Titanic stewardess) early in her career.

Themes
One of the film's major themes is class distinctions. Second Class passengers Beesley and Goodwin discuss their ambiguous position "in the middle" and debate whether class distinctions are uniquely British. Goodwin briefly encourages Beesley to pursue his apparent attraction to a young Irish beauty in Third Class, but he rejects this advice. The Third Class passengers, mostly from poor backgrounds, do not show any resentment at their meager accommodation—Katie Gilnagh comments that sleeping four-to-a-room is far more comfortable than the situation she experienced in her overcrowded childhood home—but on the night of the sinking, they struggle to evade the efforts of ship's personnel to keep them below decks and away from the lifeboats. Led by Jim Farrell, they successfully sneak up to the First Class restaurant, where Farrell persuades the Master-at-Arms to allow the women—but only the women—to pass up to the boat deck.

Another major theme is the happy, hectic atmosphere aboard ship. Young Mary Marvin comments that many of the First Class passengers are honeymooners, and that she does not want to land, but simply to go on sailing and dancing forever. In much simpler surroundings, the Third Class passengers also engage in music, dancing, winning, and whirlwind romances. Meanwhile, Beesley and Goodwin toy with the possibility of embarking on an illicit affair in an empty cabin but decide not to. Goodwin comments that shipboard romances, like shipboard friendships, are meant to end with the voyage.

A third theme is who deserved, or accepted, responsibility for the wrecking of the RMS Titanic. Captain Edward Smith, a veteran White Star captain nearing retirement, is depicted as a masterful leader who nevertheless failed to slow down in spite of being well aware that he was traveling into ice-laden waters. Shipbuilder Thomas Andrews radiates an almost saintly quality, seeing to the final details of construction and repairs himself, tenderly looking after passengers and crew, and even conversing with a young stewardess about their common hometown of Belfast. He fully understands the implications of the collision, and his knowledge that he cannot save the ship clearly breaks his heart. Meanwhile, White Star Line director J. Bruce Ismay wavers between a stance of command and an unwillingness to take responsibility for the sinking. Identifying himself as a passenger, he defiantly boards a lifeboat, only to experience a nervous breakdown later aboard the R.M.S. Carpathia rescuing ship. Ismay is the only one of these three men who survives, and it is clear that he will never fully recover from the psychological effects and blow to his reputation from the fabled sinking.

Principal differences with other film versions

It shows survivors boarding the Carpathia. The seascape is shown heavy with ice floes.

During Titanic sinking, rather than the sacred "Nearer, My God, to Thee", the ship band plays contemporary secular ragtime tunes. Howard Blake's soundtrack makes especially affecting use of the ragtime waltz "Bethena" by Scott Joplin.

Survivors discuss the silence of the disappearance of the ship and absence of screaming. Several philosophise regarding their losses.

Main cast
 David Janssen as John Jacob Astor IV
 Beverly Ross as Madeleine Astor
 Cloris Leachman as Margaret "Molly" Brown
 Susan Saint James as Leigh Goodwin
 David Warner as Lawrence Beesley (who also appears in the 1997 version, Titanic)
 Geoffrey Whitehead as Thomas Andrews
 Ian Holm as J. Bruce Ismay
 Helen Mirren as Stewardess Mary Sloan
 Harry Andrews as Captain Edward J. Smith
 Robert Pugh as James Farrell (Irish Traveller in steerage)
 Jerry Houser as Daniel Marvin
 Deborah Fallender as Mary Marvin
 Shevaun Briars as Katie Gilnagh
 Catherine Byrne as Bridget Bradley
 Nick Brimble as Olaus Abelseth
 Norman Rossington as Master-at-arms Thomas King
 Ed Bishop as Henry B. Harris
 Christopher Strauli as Harold Cottam
 John Moffatt as Benjamin Guggenheim
 Aubrey Morris as Steward John Hart
 Nancy Nevinson as Ida Straus
 Gordon Whiting as Isidor Straus
 Peter Bourke as Harold Bride
 Kate Howard as the Countess of Rothes
 Madge Ryan as Stewardess Violet Jessop
 Malcolm Stoddard as 2nd Officer Charles Lightoller
 Philip Stone as Arthur Rostron, the captain of RMS Carpathia

Production
The film was greenlit by Bernard Delfont of EMI Films, at the same time as Delfont's brother, Sir Lew Grade, was making a film based on Raise the Titanic.

Producer William Filmore called it the "thinking man's disaster film".

Locations

Several of the scenes on the exterior decks, as well as those in the ship's wheelhouse, were filmed on board the later British ocean liner from the 1930s, the retired  in Long Beach, California.

Some interior scenes were filmed at the  Waldorf and Adelphi historic hotels in London and Liverpool, respectively.  The town of Peel on the Isle of Man served as the Queenstown backdrop. Some external shots were filmed aboard, and of, the TSS Manxman which also appears as the R.M.S. Carpathia in some of the opening sequences and as the R.M.S. Titanic in a few shipboard scenes.

Versions
S.O.S. Titanic was originally broadcast as a television film on ABC on September 23, 1979. It ran for 3 hours, or approximately 144 minutes, excluding commercials. Although this version was shown on TV occasionally and bootleg copies sometimes surfaced on the internet, it was never commercially released until making its debut on home video from Kino Lorber on October 13, 2020, as both a Blu-ray and a 2-disc DVD set along with the European theatrical version.
In 1980, the film was edited to 103 minutes and released theatrically in Europe. This version has been released on DVD globally, including in the UK in April 2012 by distributor Studio Canal. In the shorter version, some storylines were completely cut.
Most 1980s and 1990s VHS video releases were edited to 98 minutes.

See also
 List of films about the RMS Titanic

References

External links
 
 
 

1979 films
1979 television films
1970s disaster films
ABC network original films
American television films
British television films
American disaster films
British disaster films
Films set in 1912
Films about RMS Titanic
Films set on ships
Seafaring films
Films scored by Howard Blake
Films directed by William Hale (director)
1970s American films
1970s British films